Virgin Run is a  long 2nd order tributary to the Youghiogheny River in Fayette County, Pennsylvania.  This is the only stream of this name in the United States.

Variant names
According to the Geographic Names Information System, it has also been known historically as:
Virgins Run

Course
Virgin Run rises in a pond in Flatwoods, Pennsylvania, and then flows northeast to join the Youghiogheny River about 2 miles southeast of Perryopolis.

Watershed
Virgin Run drains  of area, receives about 43.1 in/year of precipitation, has a wetness index of 384.82, and is about 53% forested.

References

 
Tributaries of the Ohio River
Rivers of Pennsylvania
Rivers of Fayette County, Pennsylvania
Allegheny Plateau